The women's skeet event at the 2018 Asian Games in Palembang, Indonesia took place on 25–26 August at the Jakabaring International Shooting Range.

Schedule
All times are Western Indonesia Time (UTC+07:00)

Records

Results

Qualification

Final

References

External links
 Shooting Skeet Women
 Results at asia-shooting.org

Women's skeet